Dakkada Football Club (formerly Akwa Starlets Football Club) is a Nigerian football club. They currently play in the Nigerian Professional Football League after they gained promotion from the Nigeria National League on 22 July 2019.

Dakkada FC is located in Uyo, Akwa Ibom state. Their home stadium is the Godswill Akpabio International Stadium. In 2019, they won a promotion to play in the 2019–2020 season of the Nigerian tier-1 club competition, the Nigerian Professional Football League. Their qualification makes the Niger Delta state of Akwa Ibom the only state government currently sponsoring two clubs in the premier club competition, aside from the neighboring Abia state.

History 
Dakkada FC, formerly Akwa Starlets FC was founded in 2004 by the Akwa Ibom State Government through the then Commissioner for Youths and Sports Chris Ekong as the junior team of Akwa United FC When Dakkada FC was formed they first played in the Nigerian National Amateur League 1 and gradually gained promotions. In September 2019, Akwa Starlet was crowned the 2019 Champion of the Nigeria National League. On the 31 October 2019, the club management officially re-branded the club changing the name from Akwa Starlet FC to Dakkada FC.

Current squad
As of 30 December 2020

References 

 
Football clubs in Nigeria
Sports clubs in Nigeria